Korean border may refer to:
China–North Korea border, terrestrial and maritime border
North Korea–Russia border, terrestrial and maritime border
Japan–South Korea border, maritime border; see :Category:Japan–South Korea border
Korean Demilitarized Zone, terrestrial boundary between North and South Korea
Northern Limit Line, disputed maritime demarcation line between North and South Korea